Radio Farhang is a radio station in Tehran, Iran, owned by Islamic Republic of Iran Broadcasting.

References

Radio stations in Iran